Alexander Wood (30 April 1848 – 26 October 1905) was a Scotland international rugby union player who represented Scotland from 1873 to 1875.

Rugby Union career

Amateur career

Wood played for Royal HSFP.

Provincial career

Wood represented Edinburgh District against Glasgow District in the world's second provincial match, the 'inter-city', on 15 February 1873.

Wood next played for the District on 5 December 1874 and 20 February 1875.

International career

Wood's international debut was the home match against England on 3 March 1873 at Glasgow.

Wood played again for Scotland, against England, in the following year's fixture at The Oval on 23 February 1874.

Wood's last match for Scotland, again against England, was the fixture at Raeburn Place, Edinburgh on 8 March 1875.

References

1848 births
1905 deaths
Edinburgh District (rugby union) players
Royal HSFP players
Rugby union forwards
Rugby union players from Stonehaven
Scotland international rugby union players
Scottish rugby union players